The 2000 Züri-Metzgete was the 85th edition of the Züri-Metzgete road cycling one day race. It was held on 20 August 2000 as part of the 2000 UCI Road World Cup. The race was won by Laurent Dufaux of Switzerland.

Result

References 

Züri-Metzgete
Züri-Metzgete
Züri-Metzgete